Kamasutra is a 1990 Hindi-language platinum-selling pop album by Indipop star Alisha Chinai.

Track listing
Kamasutra / कामसूत्र
Main Aur Tu / मैं और तू
Intezaar / इंतज़ार	
Rota Hai Kyoon Mera Dil / रोता है क्यूं मेरा दिल	
Jhoom Baby Jhoom / झूम बेबी झूम	
Vote For Alisha / वोट फॉर अलीशा	
Hai Gam, Humdam / है गम हमदम	
Dancing Queen / डांसिंग कुईन

References

1990 albums
Hindi-language albums
Alisha Chinai albums